Tangasauridae is a family of diapsids. Specimens have been found that are of Late Permian to Early Triassic in age from the Sakamena Group of western  Madagascar.  They lived alongside other taxa present from the Sakamena Group, including temnospondyls, rhynchosaurs, and gomphodont eucynodonts. Fossils have been found of numerous specimens of common members of this family such as Hovasaurus and Thadeosaurus in different stages of ontogenic development. Recent material from the Middle Sakamena Formation of the Morondava Basin of Madagascar that dates back to the early Triassic period suggests that the Tangasauridae were relatively unaffected by the Permian-Triassic extinction event.

Description and phylogeny

Tangasaurids are known to have been a highly derived group of diapsids. One subfamily, Kenyasaurinae, is composed of taxa that were fully terrestrial. They had long toes and highly developed sternums that made them well suited to life on land. On the other hand, the other subfamily, Tangasaurinae, is composed of taxa that were adapted to an aquatic life. They had webbed feet and a laterally compressed tails that allowed them to be able to swim in the freshwater lacustrine environment present at the time. Because of their highly derived aquatic characteristics and occurrence in time, it has been suggested that the tangasaurids were a direct ancestor of the superorder Sauropterygia, which includes many highly derived marine aquatic reptiles such as placodonts, nothosaurs, and plesiosaurs.

Classification
Despite the controversy over the definition of the order Eosuchia (to which the Tangasauridae are considered to have belonged) and as to which taxa should be considered to fall within it, the position of the tangasaurids as part of this group has rarely been questioned. An alternative order has been proposed to resolve the issues surrounding Eosuchia, the Younginiformes. Because their quadratojugal and jugal bones meet to form an arch in the skull, as is a characteristic of many primitive diapsids, tangasaurs would be included in Younginiformes.

The Tangasauridae is divided into two subfamilies, as shown below:

Family Tangasauridae
Subfamily Kenyasaurinae
Kenyasaurus
Subfamily Tangasaurinae
Acerosodontosaurus
Hovasaurus
Tangasaurus

References

Permian reptiles
Triassic diapsids
Lopingian first appearances
Early Triassic extinctions
Prehistoric neodiapsids
Prehistoric reptile families